Mohamad Amirul Hadi bin Zainal (born 27 May 1986) is a Malaysian former professional footballer who last plays for Malaysian club Johor Darul Ta'zim II and the Malaysian national team as a central midfielder. Born in Alor Gajah, Malacca but raised in Klang, Selangor, Amirul is the son of former top Selangor player in 1990s, Zainal Nordin.

Club career

Pahang FA
Amirul Hadi joined Pahang from Selangor ahead of the 2013 season. For Pahang, he played as a central midfielder. He was man of the match as Pahang took a one-goal lead in the quarter-final of the 2013 Malaysia Cup against PKNS, and on 3 November 2013, he assisted Pahang to defeat Kelantan 1–0 in the Cup Final which ended the team's 21-year drought in the Cup. In the 2013 Malaysia Super League season, he scored once in 19 appearances. After reviving his career with Pahang FA and helped them to lift the long sought trophy, he decided to not extend the contract with them for the upcoming season as he joined Johor Darul Takzim FC later for the new challenge down south.

International career
Amirul has represented the Malaysian under-23 side for the 2008 Olympic Games qualifier. He scored a brilliant solo goal against the Hong Kong under-23 teams in the qualifier.

Amirul made his senior debut against Bahrain in 2010 FIFA World Cup qualifier. Malaysia lost their first match of the qualifier 4–1 before drawing 0–0 at Shah Alam. Amirul also represented the Malaysia XI squad against Chelsea F.C. at Shah Alam Stadium on 29 July 2008. He was one of Malaysia's more impressive player in the match after getting three attempts on goal but failed to score. The Malaysia XI eventually lost 0–2. However, Chelsea coach Luiz Felipe Scolari praised the Malaysia XI for giving a good fight against his team.

Amirul scored his first international senior goal against Myanmar in 2008 Merdeka Tournament. He was also part of the 2009 Southeast Asian Games winning squad.

In November 2010, Amirul was called up to the Malaysia national squad by coach K. Rajagopal for the 2010 AFF Suzuki Cup. Amirul scored in the final group game against Laos in a 5–1 victory. Malaysia won the 2010 AFF Suzuki Cup title for the first time in their history.

On 14 July 2016, Amirul announced his retirement from international football after 34 'A' international caps and 7 'A' international goals.

Controversy

Amirul was arrested by NCID Johor State Police following found drug Methamphetamine on 10th July 2022 in Johor Bahru and charged with drug possession

International goals

Under-23

Senior team

Honours

Club
Selangor
 Malaysia Super League: 2009, 2010
 Malaysia Charity Shield: 2009, 2010
 Malaysia FA Cup: 2009

Pahang
 Malaysia Cup: 2013

Johor Darul Takzim
 Malaysia Super League: 2014, 2015, 2016, 2017
 Malaysia Charity Shield: 2015, 2016
 Malaysia Cup:(runner up) 2014, (champion) 2017
 Malaysia FA Cup: 2016
 AFC Cup: 2015

Johor Darul Ta'zim II F.C.
 Malaysia Challenge Cup(1): 2019

International
 Pestabola Merdeka: 2007
 2009 SEA Games : Gold
 2010 AFF Suzuki Cup :Winner

References

External links
 
 Mohd Amirul Hadi Zainal's Profile at F.A.M. website
 

1986 births
Living people
Malaysian footballers
Malaysia international footballers
Selangor FA players
Sri Pahang FC players
People from Malacca
Johor Darul Ta'zim F.C. players
Malaysia Super League players
Association football midfielders
Southeast Asian Games gold medalists for Malaysia
Southeast Asian Games medalists in football
Competitors at the 2007 Southeast Asian Games
Competitors at the 2009 Southeast Asian Games